Coleophora paraononidella is a moth of the family Coleophoridae. It is found in Afghanistan, the Palestinian Territories and Turkestan.

The larvae feed on Cousinia schistoptera, Cousinia albiflora and Cousinia raddeana. They feed on the leaves of their host plant.

References

paraononidella
Moths of Asia
Moths described in 1935